Puna is a village in the Punjab province of Pakistan. It is located at 29°40'57N 72°10'12E with an altitude of 111 metres (367 feet).

References

Villages in Punjab, Pakistan